The 1978–79  Gonzaga Bulldogs men's basketball team represented Gonzaga University during the 1978–79 NCAA Division I men's basketball season. Members of the Big Sky Conference, the Bulldogs were led by 
first-year head coach Dan Fitzgerald and played their home games on campus at Kennedy Pavilion in Spokane, Washington.

Gonzaga tied for fourth in the regular season standings but did not qualify for the four-team conference tournament. They lost their final game to Boise State in overtime and 
were on the short end of the tiebreaker with Montana for the fourth seed.

Senior center Paul Cathey was named to the all-conference team and four Bulldogs were honorable mention:
guard Don Baldwin, guard Eddie White, forward Carl Pierce, and forward James Sheppard.

Hired in April 1978, Fitzgerald was previously an assistant at Santa Clara; he was also an assistant at Gonzaga during Adrian Buoncristiani's first two years (1972–74) and a teammate from high school (St. Ignatius) in San Francisco.

This was the sixteenth and final year in the Big Sky Conference for charter member Gonzaga; in the summer they moved to the West Coast Athletic Conference (WCAC), trading places with Nevada.

References

External links
Sports Reference – Gonzaga Bulldogs: 1978–79 basketball season

Gonzaga Bulldogs men's basketball seasons
Gonzaga